Vampir is a 2021 European arthouse horror. The film premiered at the 2021 Sitges Film Festival.

Plot 

The story takes place in rural central Serbia, where the myth about vampires originates from.

After witnessing a crime in London and looking for a place to hide for a while, Arnaut is offered a job by charming yet ruthless local Vesna to look after a cemetery in a small remote village in Serbia. He soon starts to have nightmarish visions and is frequently visited by the mysterious older woman Baba Draga who guides Arnaut into the darkness. Only the village priest seems to be trying to keep him safe from the sinister intentions of the villagers.

Cast

Production 
The movie was set for production in June 2020, but it was postponed due to  COVID-19 restrictions. Filming took place in September 2020.

The movie is a British-Serbian-German co-production.

It was shot in the municipality of Trstenik and it was the first time for Tomović to shoot in Serbia. Vampir is the first horror movie for Yugoslav and Serbian actress Eva Ras.

Director’s Statement 
Vampir is inspired by the real vampire cases that occurred in Serbia in the early 1700s. Those were the origin of vampires. Though our film is set in modern times it’s based on those myths, superstitions and folk elements. I wanted to show a more mysterious side of Serbia.

The film also serves as an allegory of an immigrant child who was raised abroad and comes back to his ancestry’s country, where he is confronted with the local habits, traditions and way of life which are hard to accept at first.

References

External links 

 

2021 films
Serbian horror films
German horror films
English-language German films
English-language Serbian films
Films set in Serbia
Films shot in Serbia
2020s Serbian-language films
British vampire films
2020s British films
2020s English-language films
2021 multilingual films
Serbian multilingual films
German multilingual films
British multilingual films